Tekonsha may refer to:

 Tekonsha Township, Michigan
 Tekonsha, Michigan, a village